Frédéric Pierre (born 23 February 1974) is a retired Belgian football midfielder.

Career
Frédéric Pierre spent most of his career playing in his native Belgium, with two short spells in France at Nîmes Olympique and in Romania at FC Universitatea Craiova. He opened the score in the first minute of the game for Standard Liège in the 2000 Belgian Cup Final, which was eventually lost with 4–1 in favor of Genk. In the 2000–01 season Pierre played for RSC Anderlecht, helping the team win the league title.

International career
Frédéric Pierre played 8 games at international level for Belgium, making his debut when he came as a substitute and replaced Christophe Lauwers in the 61st minute of a friendly which ended 0–0 against Russia. He also appeared in a 3–0 away victory against San Marino and in a 0–3 home loss against Netherlands at the 1998 World Cup qualifiers.

Conviction
On 20 December 2014 Pierre was involved in a road accident while driving his car in Fexhe-le-Haut-Clocher. He did not stop at a red light in an intersection and hit a 58-year old woman who died. He had 0.66 mg of alcohol per liter of breathing air, 1.51 grams of alcohol per liter of blood and he was traveling at 70 km/h, also in the past he was condemned for a road accident in which a person was hurt. In 2018 the court gave Pierre a three-year suspended sentence conviction and community work.

Honours
Standard Liège
Belgian Cup runner-up: 1999–00
RSC Anderlecht
Belgian First Division: 2000–01

References

External links
 

1974 births
Living people
Belgian footballers
Racing Jet Wavre players
Beerschot A.C. players
R.W.D. Molenbeek players
R.E. Mouscron players
Standard Liège players
R.S.C. Anderlecht players
Nîmes Olympique players
K.S.K. Beveren players
K.A.S. Eupen players
FC U Craiova 1948 players
Association football midfielders
Belgian Pro League players
Belgian expatriate footballers
Expatriate footballers in France
Belgian expatriate sportspeople in France
Expatriate footballers in Romania
Belgian expatriate sportspeople in Romania
Belgium international footballers
Sportspeople from Namur (city)
Footballers from Namur (province)